Pierranthus is a monotypic genus of flowering plants belonging to the family Linderniaceae. The only known species is Pierranthus capitatus .

Its native range is Indo-China and it is found in Cambodia, Thailand and Vietnam.

The genus name of Pierranthus is in honour of Jean Baptiste Louis Pierre (1833–1905), a French botanist known for his Asian studies. The genus has one known synonym of Delpya . The Latin specific epithet of capitatus is derived from capitate meaning having dense-headed growth. Both the genus and the species were first described and published in Bull. Soc. Bot. Genève, séries 2, Vol.4 n page 254 in 1912.

References

Linderniaceae
Monotypic Lamiales genera
Plants described in 1912
Flora of Cambodia
Flora of Thailand
Flora of Vietnam